The Théâtre National Wallonie-Bruxelles (French; "National Theatre Wallonia-Brussels") is a theatre in Brussels, Belgium, owned by the French Community of Belgium.

History
The Théâtre National Wallonie-Bruxelles was founded on 19 September 1945 by Prince Charles. It is the highest ranked theatre institution for the French Community of Belgium, with the largest number of productions. Since 2023, it has been the venue of the annual Magritte Awards ceremony.

See also
 Culture of Belgium
 Royal Flemish Theatre

References

External links
 

Theatres in Brussels
Theatres completed in 1945
Brussels
Music venues in Belgium
Buildings and structures in Brussels
1945 establishments in Belgium